Guru Nanak Dev was the founder of the religion of Sikhism and the first of the ten Sikh Gurus.

Guru Nanak Dev may also refer to:
Guru Nanak Dev University, a university in Amritsar, Punjab, India
Guru Nanak Dev Engineering College, Ludhiana
Baba Guru Nanak University, Nankana Sahib, Pakistan